Edward Samuels (born 25 May 1833, date of death unknown) was an Australian cricketer. He played one first-class matches for New South Wales in 1859/60.

See also
 List of New South Wales representative cricketers

References

External links
 

1833 births
Year of death missing
Australian cricketers
New South Wales cricketers
Cricketers from Sydney